FC Lokomotyv Kupiansk was an amateur club from Kupiansk competing at the regional competitions of Kharkiv Oblast. 

The club was one of the oldest in the country being founded in 1923. With the fall of the Soviet Union, the club was dissolved.

In 1997 Lokomotyv Kupiansk was revived, but on 2 March 2016 it was announced that the club is closed.

Honours
Ukrainian football championship among amateurs
 Runners-up (1): 2012

Football championship of Kharkiv Oblast
 Winners (13): 1947, 1952, 1966, 2001, 2003, 2005–2012
 Runners-up (7): 1948, 1965, 1967, 1968, 1998, 2002, 2004

Kharkiv Oblast Football Cup
 Holders (7): 2003–2005, 2007–2009, 2011
 Finalists (1): 2014

References

External links
 Matveyev, A. Kharkiv Region: Kupyansk is ahead of the competition. Football Federation of Ukraine website. 21 November 2008

Lokomotyv Kupyansk
Lokomotyv Kupyansk
Railway association football clubs in Ukraine
Association football clubs established in 1923
Association football clubs disestablished in 2016
1923 establishments in Ukraine
2016 disestablishments in Ukraine